Ljungberg is a Swedish surname derived from ljung (heather) and berg (mountain). Youngberg is an Americanized variant of the name.

Notable persons with this name include:

 Annika Ljungberg, Swedish singer
 Birger Ljungberg (1884–1967), Norwegian Minister of Defense
 Bo Ljungberg, Swedish pole vaulter
 Einar Texas Ljungberg (1880-1974), Swedish politician
 Freddie Ljungberg, Swedish footballer
 Hanna Ljungberg, Swedish footballer
 Jon Ljungberg, Canadian television personality
 Lars Ljungberg, Swedish musician and bass guitarist of The Ark
 Mikael Ljungberg (1970-2004), Swedish wrestler
 Mikael Ljungberg (curler) (born 1961), Swedish curler
 Sven Ljungberg, Swedish visual artist

See also
 Thomas Ljungbergh (born 1963), Swedish ice hockey player
 Ljungberg Museum in Ljungby, Sweden

References 

Swedish-language surnames